This is a complete list of all the singles that entered the VG-lista - the official Norwegian hit-chart - in 1962. 57 singles entered the VG-lista in 1962 all together and these are all listed below according to how well they have charted over time.

Detaile listing of Number-one hits in 1962

Top singles of 1962

External links 
 VG-Lista - the official Norwegian hit-chart
 VG-lista - Top 100 singles of all time in Norway

Norwegian record charts
1962 record charts
1962 in Norwegian music
Norwegian music-related lists